The Kemerovo constituency (No.101) is a Russian legislative constituency in Kemerovo Oblast. Until 2007 the constituency covered the entirety of Kemerovo as well it stretched north towards Anzhero-Sudzhensk. However, after 2015 redistricting the constituency lost nearly half of Kemerovo but gained all of northern Kemerovo Oblast.

Members elected

Election results

1993

|-
! colspan=2 style="background-color:#E9E9E9;text-align:left;vertical-align:top;" |Candidate
! style="background-color:#E9E9E9;text-align:left;vertical-align:top;" |Party
! style="background-color:#E9E9E9;text-align:right;" |Votes
! style="background-color:#E9E9E9;text-align:right;" |%
|-
|style="background-color:"|
|align=left|Sergey Burkov
|align=left|Independent
|
|21.14%
|-
| colspan="5" style="background-color:#E9E9E9;"|
|- style="font-weight:bold"
| colspan="3" style="text-align:left;" | Total
| 
| 100%
|-
| colspan="5" style="background-color:#E9E9E9;"|
|- style="font-weight:bold"
| colspan="4" |Source:
|
|}

1995

|-
! colspan=2 style="background-color:#E9E9E9;text-align:left;vertical-align:top;" |Candidate
! style="background-color:#E9E9E9;text-align:left;vertical-align:top;" |Party
! style="background-color:#E9E9E9;text-align:right;" |Votes
! style="background-color:#E9E9E9;text-align:right;" |%
|-
|style="background-color:"|
|align=left|Yury Chunkov
|align=left|Communist Party
|
|33.43%
|-
|style="background-color:#2C299A"|
|align=left|Sergey Burkov (incumbent)
|align=left|Congress of Russian Communities
|
|16.13%
|-
|style="background-color:"|
|align=left|Pyotr Fink
|align=left|Independent
|
|6.95%
|-
|style="background-color:"|
|align=left|Viktor Shirokozhukhov
|align=left|Liberal Democratic Party
|
|6.83%
|-
|style="background-color:#3A46CE"|
|align=left|Aleksandr Aslanidi
|align=left|Democratic Choice of Russia – United Democrats
|
|6.29%
|-
|style="background-color:"|
|align=left|Viktor Ivshin
|align=left|Independent
|
|5.12%
|-
|style="background-color:"|
|align=left|Viktor Ovchenkov
|align=left|Our Home – Russia
|
|4.49%
|-
|style="background-color:"|
|align=left|Gennady Levin
|align=left|Agrarian Party
|
|4.33%
|-
|style="background-color:"|
|align=left|Mikhail Shchadov
|align=left|Power to the People
|
|1.30%
|-
|style="background-color:#000000"|
|colspan=2 |against all
|
|12.84%
|-
| colspan="5" style="background-color:#E9E9E9;"|
|- style="font-weight:bold"
| colspan="3" style="text-align:left;" | Total
| 
| 100%
|-
| colspan="5" style="background-color:#E9E9E9;"|
|- style="font-weight:bold"
| colspan="4" |Source:
|
|}

1999

|-
! colspan=2 style="background-color:#E9E9E9;text-align:left;vertical-align:top;" |Candidate
! style="background-color:#E9E9E9;text-align:left;vertical-align:top;" |Party
! style="background-color:#E9E9E9;text-align:right;" |Votes
! style="background-color:#E9E9E9;text-align:right;" |%
|-
|style="background-color:"|
|align=left|Pyotr Rubezhansky
|align=left|Unity
|
|66.28%
|-
|style="background-color:"|
|align=left|Yury Chunkov (incumbent)
|align=left|Communist Party
|
|11.10%
|-
|style="background-color:"|
|align=left|Andrey Mertens
|align=left|Yabloko
|
|7.22%
|-
|style="background-color:#3B9EDF"|
|align=left|Sergey Burkov
|align=left|Fatherland – All Russia
|
|4.12%
|-
|style="background-color:"|
|align=left|Nikolay Zabanov
|align=left|Independent
|
|1.35%
|-
|style="background-color:"|
|align=left|Igor Panin
|align=left|Our Home – Russia
|
|1.20%
|-
|style="background-color:#000000"|
|colspan=2 |against all
|
|7.51%
|-
| colspan="5" style="background-color:#E9E9E9;"|
|- style="font-weight:bold"
| colspan="3" style="text-align:left;" | Total
| 
| 100%
|-
| colspan="5" style="background-color:#E9E9E9;"|
|- style="font-weight:bold"
| colspan="4" |Source:
|
|}

2003

|-
! colspan=2 style="background-color:#E9E9E9;text-align:left;vertical-align:top;" |Candidate
! style="background-color:#E9E9E9;text-align:left;vertical-align:top;" |Party
! style="background-color:#E9E9E9;text-align:right;" |Votes
! style="background-color:#E9E9E9;text-align:right;" |%
|-
|style="background-color:"|
|align=left|Tamara Fraltsova
|align=left|United Russia
|
|50.78%
|-
|style="background-color:"|
|align=left|Anatoly Pristavka
|align=left|Independent
|
|18.74%
|-
|style="background-color:"|
|align=left|Yury Skvortsov
|align=left|Communist Party
|
|6.78%
|-
|style="background:#1042A5"| 
|align=left|Dmitry Sagara
|align=left|Union of Right Forces
|
|5.67%
|-
|style="background-color:"|
|align=left|Ivan Petrik
|align=left|Liberal Democratic Party
|
|3.37%
|-
|style="background-color:#00A1FF"|
|align=left|Vladimir Sinitsyn
|align=left|Party of Russia's Rebirth-Russian Party of Life
|
|1.20%
|-
|style="background-color:"|
|align=left|Viktor Dostovalov
|align=left|Independent
|
|0.79%
|-
|style="background-color:#000000"|
|colspan=2 |against all
|
|10.95%
|-
| colspan="5" style="background-color:#E9E9E9;"|
|- style="font-weight:bold"
| colspan="3" style="text-align:left;" | Total
| 
| 100%
|-
| colspan="5" style="background-color:#E9E9E9;"|
|- style="font-weight:bold"
| colspan="4" |Source:
|
|}

2016

|-
! colspan=2 style="background-color:#E9E9E9;text-align:left;vertical-align:top;" |Candidate
! style="background-color:#E9E9E9;text-align:left;vertical-align:top;" |Party
! style="background-color:#E9E9E9;text-align:right;" |Votes
! style="background-color:#E9E9E9;text-align:right;" |%
|-
|style="background-color: " |
|align=left|Tatyana Alekseyeva
|align=left|United Russia
|
|71.19%
|-
|style="background-color:"|
|align=left|Lyudmila Ryabinyuk
|align=left|A Just Russia
|
|19.85%
|-
|style="background-color:"|
|align=left|Roman Kleyster
|align=left|Liberal Democratic Party
|
|5.97%
|-
|style="background-color:"|
|align=left|Georgy Antonov
|align=left|Communist Party
|
|1.29%
|-
|style="background:"| 
|align=left|Pyotr Potapov
|align=left|Communists of Russia
|
|1.02%
|-
| colspan="5" style="background-color:#E9E9E9;"|
|- style="font-weight:bold"
| colspan="3" style="text-align:left;" | Total
| 
| 100%
|-
| colspan="5" style="background-color:#E9E9E9;"|
|- style="font-weight:bold"
| colspan="4" |Source:
|
|}

2021

|-
! colspan=2 style="background-color:#E9E9E9;text-align:left;vertical-align:top;" |Candidate
! style="background-color:#E9E9E9;text-align:left;vertical-align:top;" |Party
! style="background-color:#E9E9E9;text-align:right;" |Votes
! style="background-color:#E9E9E9;text-align:right;" |%
|-
|style="background-color:"|
|align=left|Anton Gorelkin
|align=left|United Russia
|
|66.15%
|-
|style="background-color:"|
|align=left|Yekaterina Gruntovaya
|align=left|Communist Party
|
|6.94%
|-
|style="background-color:"|
|align=left|Igor Goncharov
|align=left|A Just Russia — For Truth
|
|5.23%
|-
|style="background-color:"|
|align=left|Dmitry Sobolev
|align=left|Liberal Democratic Party
|
|5.22%
|-
|style="background-color: " |
|align=left|Kristina Frolova
|align=left|New People
|
|2.91%
|-
|style="background:"| 
|align=left|Stanislav Bury
|align=left|Communists of Russia
|
|2.82%
|-
|style="background-color:"|
|align=left|Olga Nagornaya
|align=left|The Greens
|
|2.79%
|-
|style="background-color:"|
|align=left|Gleb Alshevich
|align=left|Yabloko
|
|1.60%
|-
|style="background-color:"|
|align=left|Sergey Rubtsov
|align=left|Rodina
|
|1.43%
|-
|style="background-color:"|
|align=left|Maksim Eslivanov
|align=left|Russian Party of Freedom and Justice
|
|1.30%
|-
| colspan="5" style="background-color:#E9E9E9;"|
|- style="font-weight:bold"
| colspan="3" style="text-align:left;" | Total
| 
| 100%
|-
| colspan="5" style="background-color:#E9E9E9;"|
|- style="font-weight:bold"
| colspan="4" |Source:
|
|}

Notes

References

Russian legislative constituencies
Politics of Kemerovo Oblast